Danyame is suburb of Kumasi. Kumasi is the regional capital of the Ashanti Region of Ghana.  It is a residential area in the Kumasi Metropolitan Assembly. It is about 1 kilometre northwards from centre of the regional capital.

Notable place
The town has the northern command's officers mess. It also has several hotels and guest houses including:
Mikilin Hotel
Georgia hotel
Lé Grand's Pub (and grill house)

References

Populated places in Kumasi Metropolitan Assembly